Avraam Vaporidis also known as Avraam Efendi (1855, Fertek – 1911, Constantinople), was a distinguished Greek author, scholar and historian. He was a high-ranking dignitary of the late Ottoman Empire who also served as a senior Government official and was an inspector (Matbaalar Müfettişi) of the Court of the Imperial Ministry of Education.

Biography 
Avraam Vaporidis was born in 1855 to a Cappadocian Greek family in the city of Fertek, Niğde province in Central Anatolia. Vaporidis worked at the ministry of education and published biographies of the Ottoman Sultans and the history of the Ottoman Empire for publications in Greek schools in the late nineteenth century.

References

1855 births
1911 deaths
People from Niğde
Greek politicians
Greeks from the Ottoman Empire
Cappadocian Greeks
Political people from the Ottoman Empire